The 2005–06 season was the 105th season in Athletic Bilbao's history and their 75th consecutive season in La Liga, the top division of Spanish football.

Squad statistics

Appearances and goals

|}

See also
2005–06 La Liga
2005–06 Copa del Rey
2005 UEFA Intertoto Cup

External links

References

Athletic Bilbao
Athletic Bilbao seasons